Colorado Kool-Aid may refer to:

A slang term for Coors Beer
Red Sovine
Colorado Kool-Aid (song), a song by Johnny Paycheck involving Coors Beer and feeling "bullet -proof"